Nariman Atayev (born 25 January 1971) is a retired male boxer from Uzbekistan. He represented his native country at the 1996 Summer Olympics in Atlanta, Georgia, where he was stopped in the quarterfinals of the men's welterweight division (– 67 kg) by Puerto Rico's eventual bronze medalist Daniel Santos.

References
sports-reference

1971 births
Living people
Welterweight boxers
Boxers at the 1996 Summer Olympics
Olympic boxers of Uzbekistan
Asian Games medalists in boxing
Boxers at the 1994 Asian Games
Boxers at the 1998 Asian Games
Uzbekistani male boxers
Asian Games bronze medalists for Uzbekistan

Medalists at the 1994 Asian Games
Medalists at the 1998 Asian Games
AIBA World Boxing Championships medalists
20th-century Uzbekistani people